Hiroko Otsuka (Ōtsuka Hiroko, born March 8, 1967, Ehime) is a retired Japanese rhythmic gymnast.

She competed for Japan in the individual rhythmic gymnastics all-around competition at the 1988 Olympic Games in Seoul. She tied for 27th place in the qualification round and didn't advance to the final.

References

External links 
 Hiroko Otsuka at Sports-Reference.com

1967 births
Living people
Japanese rhythmic gymnasts
Gymnasts at the 1988 Summer Olympics
Olympic gymnasts of Japan
Sportspeople from Ehime Prefecture
20th-century Japanese women
21st-century Japanese women